Radnor was launched on 9 September 1813 at Sulkea, Calcutta. She then sailed to England.

Radnor was admitted to the Registry of Great Britain on 16 April 1814. She was sold in England and appeared in the Register of Shipping for 1815 with Barclay, master, Hogue, owner, and trade London–Île de France.

A fire destroyed Radnor on 3 September 1815 off Saugor with the loss of thirteen of her crew.

The insurers suspected arson by lascars impressed or induced to serve on the vessels.

Citations

References
 
 
 

1813 ships
British ships built in India
Age of Sail merchant ships of England
Maritime incidents in 1815
Ship fires